Herbert Franz Martin Stass (7 October 1919 – 11 November 1999) was a German film and television actor.

Filmography

References

External links
 

1919 births
1999 deaths
German male film actors
People from Oebisfelde-Weferlingen
German male television actors
20th-century German male actors